Jesse K. Hines (1829 – September 20, 1889) was a Democratic member of the Maryland House of Delegates from Kent County and served as the Speaker of the House for the 1874 session. Prior to his service in the state House, Hines was a Clerk of the Circuit Court for Kent County. Hines served as a captain in the Union Army during the Civil War.

Hines was the third state Insurance Commissioner, from 1877 until his death twelve years later in Baltimore. In 1881, he fought "graveyard insurance" companies whose policies had become a popular means for western Marylanders to speculate on others' deaths.

References

1829 births
1889 deaths
People from Kent County, Maryland
People of Maryland in the American Civil War
Speakers of the Maryland House of Delegates
19th-century American politicians